The Grand'Maison Dam is an embankment dam on L'Eau d'Olle, a tributary of the Romanche River. It is located in Vaujany of Isère within the French Alps. The primary purpose of the dam is to serve as the upper reservoir for a pumped-storage hydroelectric scheme where Lac du Verney located lower in the valley is the lower reservoir. The dam was constructed between 1978 and 1985 with its power station being commissioned in 1987. With an installed capacity of 1,800 MW, it is the largest hydroelectric power station in France.

Design and operation
The power station has above-ground and below-ground levels. On the above-ground level, there are four 150 MW Pelton turbine-generators which are used for normal conventional hydroelectric power generation. The below-ground level contains eight 150 MW Francis pump turbines which can be used for both power generation and pumping. After electricity is generated, the water is discharged into Lac du Verney, the lower reservoir. When storage in Grand'Maison needs to be replenished, the turbines reverse into pumps and move water from Lac du Verney back to the Grand'Maison Reservoir.

The power station repeats the pumped-storage process as needed and acts as a peaking power plant. Power generation or pumping can be initiated within minutes. On an annual basis, the power station generates 1,420 GWh of electricity and consumes 1,720 GWh in pumping mode. Because pumping occurs during periods of low demand when electricity is cheaper than power generation during those of high demand, the power station is profitable.

See also

List of pumped-storage hydroelectric power stations
Renewable energy in France

References

Dams in France
Embankment dams
Pumped-storage hydroelectric power stations in France
Buildings and structures in Isère
Dams completed in 1985
1987 establishments in France
Energy infrastructure completed in 1987
20th-century architecture in France